Oscar Albuquerque (born September 4, 1954) is a Canadian former soccer midfielder.  He spent most of his professional career playing indoor soccer with U.S. teams.  He is currently the president of Pro Soccer International, an ownership group which holds the rights to American Indoor Soccer League teams in Chicago and Rockford, Illinois.

Youth and college
Albuquerque was born in Lima, Peru. He moved from his native Peru to Toronto, Ontario, Canada with his family when he was fifteen.  At the time, his older brother, Hugo Albuquerque, was playing semi-professionally in Canada.  After graduating from high school, Albuquerque attended Laurentian University where he was a member of the men's soccer team from 1976 to 1979.  He was All Canadian in 1977, 1978 and 1979.  He is a member of the Laurentian University Athletic Hall of Fame.

Professional
Following graduation from college in 1980, Albuquerque signed with the Denver Avalanche of Major Indoor Soccer League (MISL). In the summer of 1980 he played in the National Soccer League with the Buffalo Blazers. He spent two seasons with the Avalanche, before the team folded in 1982.  He then moved to the Phoenix Inferno for the 1982–83 season. In 1983, the team was renamed the Phoenix Pride.  Albuquerque spent one more season in Phoenix with the Pride before moving to the Las Vegas Americans for the 1984–85 season.  The league expelled the Americans in July 1985. In the summer of 1983 he played in the Canadian Professional Soccer League with Hamilton Steelers. In February 1986, the Los Angeles Lazers were hit with numerous injuries.  The team signed Albuquerque to a ten-day contract. On February 23d, they signed him for the remainder of the season.  That summer, he signed with the expansion New York Express, a team stocked with players from the New York Arrows and New York Cosmos. The Express was unable to match the success of those two teams and folded twenty-six games into the 1986–87 season.  Albuquerque moved to the Memphis Storm of the American Indoor Soccer Association for the remainder of the 1986–87 season. In 1987 he played with North York Rockets and Hamilton Steelers of the Canadian Soccer League. He was back in MISL the next season with the Chicago Sting. However, the Sting folded at the end of the season and Albuquerque moved to the Chicago Power of the AISA for the next two seasons, 1988–1990. In 1990, the AISA has renamed the National Professional Soccer League (NPSL). Albuquerque finished his career with the Illinois Thunder of the NPSL with whom he played two seasons, 1990–1992.

National team
In 1979, Albuquerque was called into the Canadian Olympic soccer team at it entered qualification for the 1980 Summer Olympics.  Canada did not qualify for the tournament.

Coaching
In his two seasons playing with the Illinois Thunder, Albuquerque also served as an assistant coach.  On July 4, 2004, Albuquerque became an assistant coach with the expansion Chicago Storm of the Major Indoor Soccer League under head coach Frank Klopas.

Team management
In 2006, Albuquerque became the president of the expansion Rockford Rampage which competes in the Professional Arena Soccer League.

References

External links

1954 births
Living people
Businesspeople from Toronto
Canadian expatriate sportspeople in the United States
Canadian expatriate soccer players
Canadian soccer coaches
Canadian soccer players
Canadian expatriates in the United States
Chicago Power players
Chicago Sting (MISL) players
Denver Avalanche players
Expatriate soccer players in the United States
Association football midfielders
Hamilton Steelers (1981–1992) players
Illinois Thunder players
Las Vegas Americans players
Laurentian Voyageurs players
Los Angeles Lazers players
Major Indoor Soccer League (2001–2008) coaches
Major Indoor Soccer League (1978–1992) players
Memphis Storm players
National Professional Soccer League (1984–2001) players
Naturalized citizens of Canada
New York Express players
North York Rockets players
Soccer players from Toronto
Sportspeople from Lima
Peruvian emigrants to Canada
Phoenix Inferno players
Phoenix Pride players
Canadian Soccer League (1987–1992) players
Player-coaches
Canadian Professional Soccer League (original) players
Canadian National Soccer League players